Anelaphus albopilus is a species of beetle in the family Cerambycidae. It was described by Chemsak and Noguera in 2003.

References

Anelaphus
Beetles described in 2003